The Palestine Association, formerly the Syrian Society, was formed in 1805 by William Richard Hamilton to promote the study of the geography, natural history, antiquities and anthropology of Palestine and the surrounding areas, "with a view to the illustration of the Holy Writings.

The society appears to have been active for only the first five years of its existence. Scholars have suggested that the founding was ahead of its time, given that the country was at the early stages of opening to world influence, and that the timing was inopportune in the midst of the ongoing Napoleonic Wars. Scholarly work in the region began in earnest around the time of the Oriental Crisis of 1840, with the travels of Edward Robinson, the appointment of the first British consul to Jerusalem and the establishment of the Anglican-German Bishopric in Jerusalem. In 1834, the Palestine Association was formally disbanded and incorporated into the Royal Geographical Society.

The Palestine Association was the forerunner of the Palestine Exploration Fund, established 60 years later, in 1865.

Formation
The society was founded on 31 March 1805, with its first meeting of 13 members taking place on 24 April 1805, at which it was decided with no further explanation that the Syrian Society "shall henceforth be denominated The Palestine Association"

The society was formed on the basis of the 1788 African Association, and the inquiries of the Society were directed to ascertaining: 
 the natural and political boundaries of the several districts within these limits;
 the topographical and characteristic situations of Towns and Villages;
 the courses of the Streams and Rivers;
 the ranges of Mountains
 the natural productions of the Holy Land and its confines;
 each peculiarity of its soil, climate & minerals;
 elucidation of Jewish and Syrian antiquities.

British interest in Palestine had been stoked by the 1798-1801 French campaign in Egypt and Syria. Scholars have debated whether the founding of the society was driven primarily by religious and spiritual motives, or rather "reconstituted, redeployed, redistributed" in a secular orientalist framework.

Publication

In 1810, the association published the account of the travels of Ulrich Jasper Seetzen, entitled "A Brief Account of the Countries Adjoining the Lake of Tiberias, the Jordan, and the Dead Sea" In the preface to the publication, the editors noted that "We use the word Palestine not in its confined sense of a province or part of 
Judea, but in its most extended sense as comprehending all the countries on either side of the river Jordan, inhabited by the Tribes of Israel"

Notable members

Founding members
 William Richard Hamilton
 Anthony Hamilton, Archdeacon of Colchester, William Richard Hamilton's father and first President of the society
 George Hamilton-Gordon, first treasurer of the society, later President, and later Prime Minister of the United Kingdom
 Thomas William Wrighte, late fellow of Queen’s College and first secretary of the society
 Henry Ryder
 John Hawkins
 William Cockburn
 John Brand
 Alexander Dalrymple
 William George Browne
 William Drummond, previously ambassador to the Ottoman Empire
 John Spencer Smith

Other notable members
 James Rennell
 Dudley Ryder, 1st Earl of Harrowby
 Richard Ryder
 Bartholomew Frere
 William Frere
 Joseph Banks
 Admiral Sidney Smith
 George Annesley, 2nd Earl of Mountnorris
 Thomas Bruce, 7th Earl of Elgin (of Elgin Marbles fame)
 Three members of the Goldsmid family

Further reading
 Silberman N A (1982), Digging for God and country: exploration,archaeology, and the secret struggle for the Holy Land 1799–1917, Alfred Knopf, New York
 The Palestine Association Collection at The National Archives (United Kingdom)

References

Palestine (region)
Organizations established in 1805
1805 establishments in the United Kingdom